The King of Dramas is a 2012 South Korean television series,  starring Kim Myung-min, Jung Ryeo-won and Choi Siwon of Super Junior. It is a satirical dramedy about what goes on behind the scenes in making a TV drama. It aired on SBS from November 5, 2012, to January 8, 2013, on Mondays and Tuesdays at 21:55 for 18 episodes.

Plot
Set against the backdrop of the Korean entertainment business, The King of Dramas revolves around Anthony Kim (Kim Myung-min), the brilliant CEO of a drama production company who will do anything and everything for the sake of money, fame and success. He is known to possess the Midas touch as he has created blockbuster dramas and Hallyu stars. When a death on the set precipitates his fall from grace, Anthony attempts to regain his former status by putting the drama The Morning of Keijo on air. And to accomplish that, he needs the help of idealistic Lee Go-eun (Jung Ryeo-won), who dreams of becoming a top writer someday, and the handsome but egoistic actor Kang Hyun-min (Choi Siwon).

Cast
Main characters
Kim Myung-min as Anthony Kim - a drama production company CEO, who is commanding and shrewd, even under adverse circumstances. 
Jung Ryeo-won as Lee Go-eun - an idealistic, rookie writer. 
Choi Si-won as Kang Hyun-min - self-absorbed top star and Hallyu celebrity, lead actor of The Morning of Keijo. 
Jung Man-sik as Oh Jin-wan - Anthony's nemesis, the underhanded CEO of Empire Productions.
Oh Ji-eun as Sung Min-ah - prickly lead actress of The Morning of Keijo, who shares a past with Anthony.
Kwon Hae-hyo as Nam Woon-hyung - current head of drama programming.
Jung In-gi as Gu Young-mok - director of The Morning of Keijo.

Seoul Broadcasting Corporation
Song Min-hyung as Deputy director Kim
Jung Han-heon as Deputy director Park
Kim Seung-hwan as Lee Sung-jo
Lee Dong-hoon as Yoon Kwang-jae
Yoon Joo-sang as Moon Sang-il - former head of drama programming.
Jeon Gook-hwan as SBC station CEO

World Productions
Seo Dong-won as Joo Dong-seok
Heo Joon-seok as Han Kang-wook
Park Sang-hun as Park Seok-hyun
Yoon Yong-jin as Gu Hee-jae

Empire Productions
Seo Joo-hee as Jung Hong-joo
Kim Kyung-bum as Director Heo
Jang Won-young as Drama director Hong
Lee Hae-woon as PD Park
Park Geun-hyung as Chairman of Empire Productions

Extended cast
Choi Soo-eun as Yoon Bit-na - the pop star Hyun-min is dating.
Sung Byung-sook as Park Kang-ja - Go-eun's mother and restaurant proprietor.
Oh Hyun-soo as Choi Do-hyung
Park Kyu-sun as Bae Kwang-soo
Jeon Moo-song as Watanabe - Japanese yakuza investor.
Mina Fujii as Akiko - Watanabe's wife 
Jang Hyun-sung as Watanabe Kenji - new CEO of Watanabe Group.
Jung Chan as chairman of Taesan Group 
Park Shin-hye as lead actress of Elegant Revenge (cameo, ep 1) 
Choi Tae-joon as Oh In-sung - lead actor of Elegant Revenge (cameo, ep 1)
Park Joon-geum as Hyun-min's mother (cameo, ep 7)

Production
This was Kim Myung-min's first TV series in four years; his last series was Beethoven Virus in 2008 and the actor had focused more on his film career in recent years.

The series is directed by Hong Sung-chang of You're Beautiful and written by Jang Hang-jun of Sign. Filming began on September 14, 2012, in Yeouido, Seoul.

Choi Siwon filmed his first scene on September 26 with Jung Ryeo-won. He sang a solo during his character's fan meeting scene, for which he recruited his fans as extras.

It was announced on December 17 that the series was extended by two episodes from the original 16 to 18. The finale aired on January 8, 2013, with the last two episodes focusing on the romance between the characters of Anthony Kim and Lee Go-eun.

Reception

References

External links
The King of Dramas official SBS website 

Seoul Broadcasting System television dramas
Korean-language television shows
2012 South Korean television series debuts
2012 South Korean television series endings
Television series about television
South Korean romantic comedy television series
South Korean comedy-drama television series